Airport Connector is a typical name for roads connecting major highways to airports. It may refer to:

 Airport Connector (Harrisburg), a short freeway connecting Pennsylvania Route 283 to Harrisburg International Airport
 T. F. Green Airport Connector Road, a short freeway connecting Interstate 95 to T. F. Green Airport near Warwick, Rhode Island
 Bradley Airport Connector, a freeway connecting Interstate 91 to Bradley International Airport near Hartford, Connecticut
 McCarran Airport Connector, a partially limited-access road designated Nevada State Route 171, connecting McCarran International Airport to Interstate 215 and Nevada State Route 593 (Tropicana Avenue) in Paradise, Nevada
 Hardy Airport Connector, a tolled connection from the Hardy Toll Road to George Bush Intercontinental Airport in Houston, Texas

See also
 Airport Tunnel (disambiguation)

Airport infrastructure